(1923, Osaka – January 14, 2012, Maizuru, Kyoto) was a Japanese professional shogi player.

Nishimoto impaired visibility in his high school days at playing baseball. Having severe visible impairment, he aimed to be a shogi player. He became a student of Kimi in 1940 and was promoted to 4dan, the lowest professional rank in 1948.

His visible impairment hindered him to play shogi, even though he was accompanied by an assistant during play. He lost his visibility in 1962 completely. In 1959 he was disqualified to play at Ranking tournament C2 class and played for free at Shoreikai until his retirement.

He died on January 14, 2012, aged 88, after a battle with pneumonia.

References

1923 births
2012 deaths
Japanese shogi players
Deaths from pneumonia in Japan
Sportspeople with a vision impairment
Deceased professional shogi players
Professional shogi players from Osaka Prefecture
People from Osaka